Conizonia aresteni is a species of beetle in the family Cerambycidae. It was described by Maurice Pic in 1951. It is known from Morocco.

References

Saperdini
Beetles described in 1951